Gerhard Treschow (c.1659 – 23 May 1719) was a Danish-Norwegian merchant and industrial pioneer.  Treschow was an important industrial pioneer who founded several companies in Christiania and he was one of the first Norwegians to produce large-scale paper.

Biography
He was born into a family of merchants on the island of Møn in south-eastern Denmark. After attending  the University of Utrecht,   he was appointed tax collector as tax collector in Christiania (now Oslo) Norway in 1683. His business operations started in 1690, when he became the owner of a brickworks at Christiania. In time, he came to own  six sawmills  in Norderhov. He was a major exporter of lumber as well as the owner of a fleet of ships.

Between 1693 to 1694,  Gerhard Treschow began to collaborate with Ole Bentsen (1653-1734) who had a 15 year royal charter to create a paper mill at Christiania.  He had worked together with Dutch experts and machinery delivered from England. Export of  paper started in 1696. In 1698, he  demanded the forced sale of Bentsen's interests. That same year, Treschow took over the royal privileges of the paper mill. This would become the forerunner for the founding of Bentse Brug,  Norway's first paper mill. He also owned Bjølsen sawmill at Akerselva. By 1697, he was  co-owner of four major ships and by 1705 one of the  larger shipowners in Christiania.

Personal life
In 1688, he was married  Karen Hansdatter Lemmich (1667–1727).
In 1710, he was built his residence,  Treschowgården, in Christiania where he died during 1719.

His son, Justus Gotthard Treschow, (1692-1730) took over  management of his father's business interests. His daughter Catharine (1690-1727) married Johannes Trellund (1669-1735) who was  Bishop of the Diocese of Viborg.

See also
Treschow (noble family)

References

1659 births
1719 deaths
17th-century Danish businesspeople
18th-century Danish businesspeople
18th-century Norwegian businesspeople
Danish merchants
Norwegian merchants
People from Møn
Danish emigrants to Norway